The Chief of Naval Staff (reporting name as CNS), is a military appointment and a Statutory office held by a four-star admiral in the Pakistan Navy, who is nominated and appointed by the Prime Minister of Pakistan and confirmed by the President of Pakistan.

The Chief of Naval Staff is one of the senior-most appointments in the Pakistan military who is one of the senior members of the Joint Chiefs of Staff Committee in a separate capacity, providing senior consultation to the Chairman Joint Chiefs of Staff Committee to act as a principal military advisor to the Prime Minister of Pakistan and its civilian government in the line of defending and safeguarding the expedition, maritime and sealine borders of the nation.

The Chief of Naval Staff exercise its responsibility of command and control of the operational, combatant, logistics, administration, and training commands within the Pakistan Navy, in a clear contrast to the U.S. Navy's Chief of Naval Operations (CNO). Due to its responsibility and importance, the Chief of Naval Staff plays a critical role in assessing the coastal defence and conducting reconnaissance to insure its strike capability against aggressive forces.

In principle, the appointment is constitutionally subjected for three years but extensions may be granted by the President upon recommendations and approvals from the Prime Minister. The Chief of Naval Staff is based on the Navy NHQ, and the current Chief of Naval Staff is Admiral 
Admiral Muhammad Amjad Khan Niazi serving as chief of naval staff, who took over the command as chief of naval staff on 7 October 2020.

History

The Pakistan Navy was created from the partition of the Royal Indian Navy after the India's partition on 14/15 August of 1947. Direct appointments in the navy was in the responsibility of the British Admiralty who appointed Rear Admiral James Wilfred Jefford as Pakistan Navy's first Flag Officer Commanding (FOC).

The post was changed to Commander-in-Chief when Vice-Admiral Mohammad Siddiq Choudri became the first native naval commander in 1953, and the title changed from Commander in Chief to Chief of Staff in 1969 with Vice-Admiral Muzaffar Hassan acting as Commander-in-Chief and Rear-Admiral Rashid Ahmad as Chief of Staff. On 20 March 1972, the renamed as "Chief of Naval Staff" (CNS) with Vice-Admiral H.H. Ahmed becoming the first chief of naval staff, though his rank was not elevated to four-star rank.

The term of the superannuation was then constrained to three years in the office as opposed to four years and was made a permanent member of Joint Chiefs of Staff Committee. Since 1972, there have been 14 four-star rank admirals appointed as chiefs of naval staff by statute. The Prime Minister, with the President's confirmation, approved the nomination and appointment of the Chief of Naval Staff.

The leadership of the navy is based in the Navy NHQ located in the vicinity of Air AHQ, and Army GHQ staff offices that form that JS HQ in the Rawalpindi District, Punjab, Pakistan. The CNS controls the navy, assisted by the civilians from the Navy Secretariat-III of the Ministry of Defence (MoD).

The Chief of Naval Staff exercises its responsibility of completing operational, training and logistics commands. The CNS has several principal staff officers and controls the navy through seven principle staff commands directed by its appointed Deputy Chiefs of Naval Staff.

DCNS Operations 
DCNS Supply
DCNS Training and Personal
DCNS Projects
DCNS Materials
DCNS Administration
DCNS Welfare and Housing

List of Chiefs of the Naval Staff
The following is a list of Admirals who have served as either Commander-in-Chief or the Chief of the Naval Staff of the Pakistan Navy.

Naval Commanders-in-Chief, Pakistan Navy

Chiefs of the Naval Staff (CNS) of Pakistan Navy

See also
Pakistan Navy
Vice Chief of the Naval Staff (Pakistan)
List of Pakistan Navy admirals
Chairman Joint Chiefs of Staff Committee (Pakistan)
Chief of Army Staff (Pakistan)
Chief of Air Staff (Pakistan)
Chief of General Staff (Pakistan)

References

External links
Official website of Pakistan Navy

1
Pakistan Navy admirals
Pakistan
Pakistan Navy appointments